Zain Al Fandi (born 15 January 1983 in Syria) is a Syrian football.

Honour and Titles

National Team
Nehru Cup:
Runner-up (1): 2007

References

External links
 
 

1983 births
Living people
Syrian footballers
Syria international footballers
Al-Arabi SC (Kuwait) players
Syrian expatriate footballers
Syrian expatriate sportspeople in Kuwait
Association football defenders
Taliya SC players
Syrian Premier League players
Al-Sahel SC (Kuwait) players
Expatriate footballers in Kuwait
Kuwait Premier League players